Austin M. Bibens-Dirkx (born April 29, 1985) is an American former professional baseball pitcher and current coach. He played in Major League Baseball (MLB) for the Texas Rangers and for the Uni-President Lions of the Chinese Professional Baseball League (CPBL).

Amateur career
Bibens-Dirkx attended McNary High School in Keizer, Oregon, Chemeketa Community College, and later the University of Portland.  He was drafted by the Seattle Mariners in the 16th round of the 2006 Major League Baseball draft.

Professional career

Seattle Mariners
He went a combined 2–2 with a 1.64 ERA and five saves in 38 innings pitched. In  Bibens-Dirkx played for the Class-A Advanced High Desert Mavericks of the California League. He went 3–1 with a 4.42 ERA, 26 strikeouts and eight saves. Bibens-Dirkx split the  season between the High Desert Mavericks and the Rookie level Peoria Mariners. He was placed on the disabled list twice and made rehab starts in Peoria. He went a combined 3–1 with a 7.06 ERA in 38 games.

Victoria Seals
In , Bibens-Dirkx played for the Victoria Seals of the Golden Baseball League.

Chicago Cubs
The Chicago Cubs purchased his contract partway into the season. He was then assigned to the Class-A Peoria Chiefs. Bibens-Dirkx finished the season with a 7–2 record with a 2.04 ERA, 50 strikeouts and one save in 12 games, eight starts. He remained with the Cubs organization for the next two seasons while also pitching in the offseasons in the Venezuelan winter league with Águilas del Zulia.

Washington Nationals
In January 2012, Bibens-Dirkx signed a minor league deal with the Washington Nationals that included an invitation to spring training. He pitched for the Double-A Harrisburg Senators and Triple-A Syracuse Chiefs in 2012.

Colorado Rockies
After leaving the Nationals organization, Bibens-Dirkx finished 2012 pitching for the Triple-A Colorado Springs Sky Sox in the Colorado Rockies organization. He once again pitched in Venezuela with Zulia in the offseason.

Toronto Blue Jays
Bibens-Dirkx played for the High-A Dunedin Blue Jays and Double-A New Hampshire Fisher Cats in 2013 in the Toronto Blue Jays organization and also with Zulia again in the offseason. In 2014, he played for New Hampshire and the Triple-A Buffalo Bisons. He pitched again in the offseason but this time with Toros del Este in the Dominican winter league. He was signed to a minor league contract by the Blue Jays in November 2014 and spent the 2015 season with Buffalo and New Hampshire. On November 6, 2015, Bibens-Dirkx elected free agency. He spent that offseason back in Venezuela, this time with Tigres de Aragua.

Lancaster Barnstormers
On April 5, 2016, Bibens-Dirkx signed with the Lancaster Barnstormers of the Atlantic League of Professional Baseball.

Texas Rangers
On June 14, 2016, Bibens-Dirkx signed a minor league deal with the Texas Rangers and spent the rest of the season with Triple-A Round Rock Express. He then pitched again with Aragua in the offseason. He signed another minor league contract with the Rangers on December 16, 2016. He began the 2017 season with the Express.

On May 7, 2017, the Rangers promoted Bibens-Dirkx to the major leagues. He made his major league debut on May 17, 2017, pitching one inning and giving up one earned run. He struck out Tommy Joseph for his first major league strikeout. He was outrighted to Triple-A on November 6, 2017, but declined the assignment and became a free agent. On December 19, he signed a new minor league contract with the Rangers. He was assigned to AAA Round Rock Express to begin the 2018 season but also pitched 13 games with the Rangers during the season. He elected free agency after the season.

Uni-President Lions
On January 12, 2019, Bibens-Dirkx signed with the Uni-President Lions of the Chinese Professional Baseball League (CPBL). He was released on June 13, 2019, as Bibens-Dirkx wished to be with his wife in the U.S., as she was expecting a baby.

Texas Rangers (second stint)
On June 29, 2019, Bibens-Dirkx signed a minor-league contract with the Texas Rangers and was assigned to the team's new Triple-A affiliate, the Nashville Sounds. Bibens-Dirkx was released by the Rangers organization on June 1, 2020.

Los Angeles Dodgers
On May 4, 2021, Bibens-Dirkx signed a minor league contract with the Los Angeles Dodgers organization. He appeared in 25 games (17 starts) for the AAA Oklahoma City Dodgers and had a 10–6 record and 5.13 ERA.

Mexican League
On February 7, 2022, Bibens-Dirkx signed with the Sultanes de Monterrey of the Mexican League for the 2022 season. In 3 starts, he posted a 0–1 record and 6.00 ERA. On May 10, 2022, Bibens-Dirkx was traded to the Algodoneros de Unión Laguna of the Mexican League. He made just one start, giving up 4 earned runs in 2 innings pitched. Bibens-Dirkx was released by the team on May 17, 2022.

Coaching career
On January 17, 2023, Bibens-Dirkx announced that he had retired from playing and had joined the Toronto Blue Jays organization as a minor league pitching coach.

References

External links

Bibens-Dirkx Uni-President Lions player page
 

1985 births
Living people
Águilas del Zulia players
Algodoneros de Unión Laguna players
American expatriate baseball players in Canada
American expatriate baseball players in the Dominican Republic
American expatriate baseball players in Mexico
American expatriate baseball players in Taiwan
American expatriate baseball players in Venezuela
Arizona League Mariners players
Baseball coaches from Oregon
Baseball players from Oregon
Boise State University alumni
Buffalo Bisons (minor league) players
Charros de Jalisco players
Chemeketa Storm baseball players
Colorado Springs Sky Sox players
Dunedin Blue Jays players
Everett AquaSox players
Harrisburg Senators players
High Desert Mavericks players
Iowa Cubs players
Lancaster Barnstormers players
Leones del Escogido players
Major League Baseball pitchers
Mexican League baseball pitchers
Minor league baseball coaches
Nashville Sounds players
New Hampshire Fisher Cats players
Oklahoma City Dodgers players
People from Keizer, Oregon
Peoria Chiefs players
Portland Pilots baseball players
Round Rock Express players
Sportspeople from Salem, Oregon
Sultanes de Monterrey players
Syracuse Chiefs players
Tacoma Rainiers players
Tennessee Smokies players
Texas Rangers players
Tigres de Aragua players
Tigres del Licey players
Toros del Este players
Victoria Seals players
Wisconsin Timber Rattlers players
Uni-President Lions players